Stephen William Halliday (born 3 May 1976) is an English retired professional footballer who played his entire career as a striker. His career included spells in England and Scotland.

Halliday started his career at Hartlepool United, making 167 appearances in total, scoring 27 goals. This resulted in a £50,000 move to Scottish Premier League club Motherwell in 1998. He did not hold down a regular first team place there and he eventually moved on loan to Carlisle United. He was released by Motherwell in 2000 and then joined Doncaster Rovers. After only three months in South Yorkshire, he left to re-join Cumbrian club Carlisle United for two years before moving to non-league side Durham City.

References

External links

Living people
1976 births
Footballers from Sunderland
English footballers
Association football forwards
Hartlepool United F.C. players
Motherwell F.C. players
Carlisle United F.C. players
Doncaster Rovers F.C. players
Durham City A.F.C. players
English Football League players
Scottish Premier League players